Buchs may refer to:

Places
Several towns in Switzerland are called Buchs:
Buchs, Aargau
Buchs, St. Gallen 
Buchs, Zurich
Buchs, Lucerne in the municipality of Dagmarsellen

People with the surname 
Emanuel Buchs (born 1962), Swiss ski mountaineer, cross-country skier and biathlete
Herbert Büchs (1913–1996), German Air Force general and Luftwaffe officer

See also
 Buch (disambiguation)
 Bucks (disambiguation)
 Bucs (disambiguation)
 Bux (disambiguation)